The Lords of Summer Tour was a concert tour by American heavy metal band Metallica in support of their single "Lords of Summer", which was released on March 19, 2014.

Set list 

Setlist from Quebec City, Canada (September 16, 2015)

 "Creeping Death"
 "Master of Puppets"
 "Battery"
 "Harvester of Sorrow"
 "Ride the Lightning"
 "The Unforgiven II"
 "St. Anger"
 "Wherever I May Roam"
 "Sad But True"
 "Welcome Home (Sanitarium)"
 "The Frayed Ends of Sanity"
 "One"
 "For Whom the Bell Tolls"
 "Fade to Black"
 "Seek and Destroy"

Encore
 "Turn the Page"
 "Nothing Else Matters"
 "Enter Sandman"

Tour dates 

The tour's Quebec City stops served as the final event held at Colisée Pepsi before its closure, and the first-ever concert event held at its replacement, Videotron Centre.

Personnel
James Hetfield – lead vocals, rhythm guitar
Lars Ulrich – drums
Kirk Hammett – lead guitar, backing vocals
Robert Trujillo – bass, backing vocals

References

Metallica concert tours
2015 concert tours